Chariesthes schatzmayri is a species of beetle in the family Cerambycidae. It was described by Stephan von Breuning in 1940. It is known from Kenya and Somalia.

References

Chariesthes
Beetles described in 1940